Joe Kelly (born 1954) is an American author known primarily for books on fathering.

Career
Kelly was born in northern New Jersey, and grew up in Ohio and South Jersey. He attended LeMoyne College and graduated from the University of Wisconsin–Superior.  Before working on girls’ and fathering issues, Kelly was a reporter, producer, and regional news director for Minnesota Public Radio.

He was co-founder, with Michael Kieschnick, of a national advocacy nonprofit for fathers and daughters in the United States, Dads and Daughters (DADs), which operated from 1999 until 2008. In 1993, he helped his wife Nancy Gruver to found New Moon magazine, edited by girls 8 to 14 years old.

Books
Kelly is the author of several books on fathering.

Personal 
Kelly and his wife have twin daughters, who were born in 1980.

References

External links 

1954 births
Living people
American family and parenting writers
Le Moyne College alumni
University of Wisconsin–Superior alumni
Writers from New Jersey